Sagers is a surname. Notable people with the surname include:

Aaron Sagers, American television presenter, entertainment journalist, and author
Douglas Sagers, American politician

See also
 Sager